The following is a list of big band musicians.

 Ray Anthony (b. 1922)
 Buster Bailey (1902–1967)
 Count Basie (1904–1984)
John Beasley (b. 1960)
 Bix Beiderbecke (1903–1931)
 Les Brown (1912–2001)
 Xavier Cugat (1900–1990)
 Jimmy Dorsey (1904–1957)
 Duke Ellington (1899–1974)
 Chico Freeman (b. 1949)
 Dizzy Gillespie  (1917–1993)
 Lionel Hampton (1908–2002)
 Andy Kirk (1898–1992)
 Eddie Lang (1902–1933)
 Wynton Marsalis (b. 1961)
 George Paxton (1914–1989)
 Joe Venuti (1903–1978)
 Chick Webb (1905–1939)
 Teddy Wilson (1912–1986)

References

Big Band